The Melbourne Boomers are an Australian professional basketball team based in Melbourne, Victoria. The Boomers compete in the Women's National Basketball League (WNBL) and play the majority of their home games at Melbourne Sports Centre – Parkville and the State Basketball Centre. For sponsorship reasons, they are known as the Deakin Melbourne Boomers. Entering the WNBL in 1984, the club is both the oldest WNBL club and the longest-running elite-level women's sports team in Australia (in any sport).

History 
The club was established in 1969 and, after missing out in 1983, was accepted into the Women's National Basketball League (WNBL) in 1984 under the name of Bulleen Boomers, named after the suburb of the same name. Applications were prepared and presented by Jan Collinson, who remained the club's delegate to the League for many years with her efforts being rewarded with a Life Membership to the League in 2001. Other workers crucial to Bulleen's entry in the WNBL in the club's formative years were Janice McLeod, Gary Turner and John Barker.

The Boomers' first coach was Trevor Cook and the initial team included Michele Timms and Samantha Thornton who both would go on to represent Australia with distinction in future years. The club first qualified for the finals in 1989 under the guidance of coach Paul Deacon and, after progressing to the same stage the following year, missed the playoffs until 1996 when, in coach Lori Chizik's first season, Bulleen finished third in the regular season before bowing out in the semi-finals.

Chizik led the Boomers to 1999/00 preliminary final, the club's best ever result. Cheryl Chambers took over in 2001/02 and steered the club to two finals appearances, including the 2004/05 preliminary final.

The Boomers have called Sheahan's Road Basketball Centre, Bulleen, Keilor Basketball Stadium, the Melbourne Entertainment Centre and the Veneto Club home before moving to their current home at the State Basketball Centre, Wantirna.

Since its inception, Bulleen has remained a Club-based program. However, the players and administration of the club have become much more professional and the presentation of the games has improved markedly. The club boasts a remarkably strong junior program and has been instrumental in the development of some of Australia's best ever basketballers, such as Debbie Slimmon, Samantha Russell, Karin Maar, Tammy Good, Gaylene McKay, Cheryl Chambers.

However, none have had a bigger influence on Australian hearts and minds than Michele Timms. Timms has long been recognised as the most talented female basketballer Australia has ever produced. As a three-time Olympian, four-time World Championship athlete and Australian captain, she represented Australia with absolute excellence.

Still one of the most recognisable Australian athletes in the country, Timms was a pioneer for young Australian female basketballers – she was the first Australian to play in the Women's National Basketball Association (WNBA) and also had a successful career in Europe and the US. Timms remains actively involved in the Club, particularly at the Junior level and is passionate about being involved at the grass roots level in encouraging kids to enjoy basketball and improve their game.

In the mid-2000s the likes of Katrina "Froggy" Hibbert and Hollie Grima formed the backbone of Boomers teams. Hibbert won back-to-back League MVP awards during the 2004/05 and 2005/06 season while Grima followed up her World Championship gold medal with the Opals in 2006 by being crowned league MVP in 2006/07 and then winning Silver at the Beijing Olympics in 2008.

Over the last several years, the heart and soul of Bulleen have been Club stalwarts Desiree Glaubitz and Sharin Milner. Both have been rewarded with Opals squad selection and Milner is twice winner of the WNBL Golden Hands Award (2003/04 and 2008/08).

In 2009 and 2010 the addition of Liz Cambage, Rachel Jarry and Jenna O'Hea provided the final pieces to the puzzle and in March 2011, the Boomers were crowned WNBL Champions. Before the 2013/14 season, the Boomers changed their name from "Bulleen" to "Melbourne" to target a wider area of population and boost crowd numbers. The team also changed its colours from blue and gold to purple and gold.

Prior to the start of the 2016/17 WNBL season, the license to run the Melbourne Boomers changed hands. After 32 years, BTBC transferred the license to run the WNBL team to a group of private owners, all who have a passion for women’s basketball and want to see the Boomers continue to grow as Australia’s most iconic women’s basketball team.

In season 2017/18 the Boomers returned to the finals and fell just short in the Grand Final series against Townsville. In a groundbreaking season for Melbourne’s WNBL club, the Boomers recorded the highest crowds in the WNBL, including a season-best 3,655 on 18 January.

The 2018/19 Season once again saw the Boomers reach the WNBL finals series, only to fall devastatingly short in the semi-finals against Adelaide. Despite missing out on the Grand Final, this season was still a success for the Boomers, who once again drew big crowds to their games, and were able to provide a great atmosphere and experiences at their home venue, State Basketball Centre.

Today’s team includes talented young Australians like Maddie Garrick, Chelsea D’Angelo and Ezi Magbegor, as well as four New Zealand Tall Ferns players. Coach Guy Molloy continues to be a constant behind the scenes, and with the signing of Assistant Coach Larissa Anderson in 2019/20, the coaching team set to grow even stronger.

With the recent appointment of Christy Collier as the club’s GM, the Boomers have their sights set on even greater things in the 2019/20 Season, both on and off the court. Christy is an exciting addition to the Boomers team, having over 20 years of experience in marketing, operations and business roles, as well as having played for the Canberra Capitals in the WNBL throughout the nineties.

After nine years as the coach for Melbourne Boomers, and finishing with the 2021-22 NBL championship, Coach Guy Molloy moved to Basketball New Zealand and the Boomers hired Chris Lucas to replace him for the 2022-2023 season.

Players

Current roster

Former coaches 
  Cheryl Chambers
  Guy Molloy
  Paul Flynn

Former players 
  Karin Maar
  Michele Timms
  Allison Tranquilli
  Debbie Slimmon
  Samantha Thornton
  Katrina Hibbert
  Sharin Milner
  Desiree Glaubitz
  Hollie Grima
  Rachel Jarry
  Alice Kunek
  Rebecca Allen
  Liz Cambage
  Jenna O'Hea
  Ashleigh Karaitiana
  Rachel Antoniadou
  Antonia Farnworth
  Stella Beck
  Madeleine Garrick
  Kalani Purcell
  Carley Ernst
  Izzy Wright
  Lindsay Allen
  Ezi Magbegor

References

External links
 Official WNBL website
 Melbourne Boomers official website

 
Women's National Basketball League teams
Basketball teams in Melbourne
Basketball teams established in 1969
1969 establishments in Australia
Sport in the City of Knox